Storrs is a hamlet within the boundaries of the City of Sheffield in England, it is situated  6.5 km (4 miles) west-northwest of the city centre. Storrs is located between the suburb of Stannington and the village of Dungworth in the civil parish of Bradfield at a height of 210 metres above sea level between the Loxley and Rivelin valleys. Although historically a farming settlement, water-powered milling on the Storrs Brook and small scale cutlery making has also taken place in the hamlet.

History
The name Storrs is a derivation of the Old Norse word “Storth” which means a wooded place and is commonly found in the names of Viking settlements set up in woodland clearings. One of the first written references to the hamlet was in 1288 when the ancient Hallamshire family of Shaw first became established after Ralph del Shagh became a tenant at a local farm, the surname continued at the same farm for the next four centuries. There was another reference in 1323 when William, the son of Anne Dungworth was admitted to a small farm at Storrs.

The moors and common land around Storrs was enclosed between 1791 and 1805, the proposal which was put forward by Charles Howard, 11th Duke of Norfolk and other landowners in 1787 met with some hostility by “several of the freeholders and inhabitants” as the usage of the land became controlled by the owner. However, none of the challengers to the policy owned enough land to defy the large landowners. In 1881 it was recorded that nine men from Storrs were working at the pot clay drift mine at Load Brook, two km to the west.

Mills on the Storrs Brook
The Storrs Brook flows just to the south of the hamlet and joins the River Loxley at Rowell Bridge. The brook has been used to power two mills over the years. Storrs Mill dates from 1749 when it was a snuff mill, by 1783 it had been converted into a paper mill and it served as such until the middle of the 19th century. After being used as a corn mill for a time it was unoccupied and disused by 1931. Storrs Mill has now been renovated and is a private residence, the two mill dams are still visible within the grounds. Loxley Wire Mill was situated further downstream, near the brooks confluence with the River Loxley. It dates from 1693 and was used as a cutlers wheel, smelt mill, wire mill and corn mill over the years. It was damaged in the Great Sheffield Flood of 1864, today there are no visible signs.

Buildings and amenities
Many of the present day buildings in Storrs have had a change in usage over the years. The cruck barn at Throstle Nest Farm is a grade II listed building which dates from the 17th century, it has four pairs of crucks within it. The barn has been converted into residential use in recent years and has been available to rent as a holiday cottage. The old Sunday school building was built in 1821 and closed in 1884 when a new chapel was built in the hamlet, it is now in residential use.

Storrs Chapel built in 1884 and closed in 1975 is also now a private residence known as Wesley House, the village shop also underwent the same fate when it closed in the 1960s. Chapel cottages and Storrs Green cottages are both long-standing groups of housing, Chapel cottages was built in the latter part of the 1700s, a cutlers shop operated at the rear at one stage. Storrs House Farm has operated a boarding cattery for many years. Storrs Hall was the home for a time of Thomas Wragg, owner of the nearby fire brick factory. Other buildings in the hamlet include Storrs Green Farm, which is still a working farm, Storrs Grange Farm, and Hazelhurst Farm.

Storrs Park is a small recreation area for the community, it is located at the junction of Storrs Lane and Lee Moor Lane. The park consists of a few children's swings and an area of grass on land leased and maintained by Bradfield Parish Council. There is no public transport for the hamlet, although the 762 school bus service passes through to take pupils to Bradfield School at Worrall.

References

Villages of the metropolitan borough of Sheffield
Towns and villages of the Peak District